Archibald Livingstone (15 November 1915 – 12 August 1961) was a Scottish professional footballer who played in the Football League for Newcastle United, Bury, Southport and Everton as an inside forward or right half.

Career statistics

References 

English Football League players
Brentford F.C. wartime guest players
Scottish footballers
Association football wing halves
1915 births
1961 deaths
Footballers from East Lothian
Ormiston Primrose F.C. players
Newcastle United F.C. players
Bury F.C. players
Peterborough United F.C. players
Wrexham F.C. wartime guest players
Everton F.C. players
Southport F.C. players
Glenavon F.C. players
Worksop Town F.C. players
Rochdale A.F.C. wartime guest players